Santhakaviti is a village in Vizianagaram district of the Indian state of Andhra Pradesh. It is located in Santhakaviti mandal of Cheepurupalli revenue division.

References 

Villages in Vizianagaram district
Mandal headquarters in Vizianagaram district